6126 may refer to:

 6126 (clothing line), an American brand
 Nokia 6126, a 2006 mobile telephone
 ZD6126, a vascular-targeting agent and a prodrug of N-acetylcolchinol
 a year in the 7th millennium